The River of Souls is the third feature-length film set in the Babylon 5 universe. It was originally broadcast on November 8, 1998 on TNT, as one of two films shown over the 1998–1999 season to fill in the gap between the fifth season of Babylon 5 and the spin-off series Crusade.

Plot synopsis

After a short absence from Babylon 5, Michael Garibaldi returns to the station to meet with a person in his employ. An archaeologist in search of a means of immortality brings his most recent find to Babylon 5 – an orb containing one billion souls of an extinct race. Within days, a Soul Hunter (played by Martin Sheen) arrives claiming the orb was stolen from his people. With the assistance of the archaeologist, the souls break free from their captivity in the orb and bring havoc to the station.

Cast
 Jerry Doyle as Michael Garibaldi
 Tracy Scoggins as Capt. Elizabeth Lochley
 Jeff Conaway as Security Chief Zack Allan
 Richard Biggs as Stephen Franklin
 Ian McShane as Dr. Robert Bryson
 Martin Sheen as Soul Hunter
 Josh Coxx as Lt. David Corwin (credited as Joshua Cox)
 Stuart Pankin as James Riley
 Joel Brooks as Jacob Mayhew
 Jeff Doucette as 2nd Man
 Jeff Silverman as Mr. Clute
 Wayne Alexander as Soul One
 Bob Amaral as Customer
 Beege Barkette as Woman (as Beece Barkett)
 T.J. Hoban as Male Hologram
 Ray Proscia as Klaus
 Nikki Ziering as Female Hologram
 Jean St. James as Sheila

External links
 
 
 

River of Souls
1998 television films
1998 films
1990s science fiction films
TNT Network original films
Films set in the 23rd century
American science fiction television films
Films based on television series
Television films based on television series
Action television films
Films scored by Christopher Franke
1990s English-language films
Films directed by Janet Greek
1990s American films